Walker Center (formerly Walker Bank Building) is a skyscraper in Salt Lake City, Utah, United States.

Description

The building was opened on December 9, 1912, taking a little over a year to be built. At the time of its completion, it stood as the tallest building between Chicago and San Francisco (16 stories, 220 ft/67 m). It was originally constructed as the headquarters for Walker Bank, founded by the Walker brothers: Samuel Sharp, Joseph Robinson, David Frederick, and Matthew Walker, Jr.  The basement originally contained the vault for the bank, as well as a barbershop, florist, cigar store, and other shops. The main floor contained the bank, and upper floors were used as office space. It was designed by the St. Louis, Missouri-based architecture firm Eames and Young. It remained the headquarters of Walker Bank until it merged with First Interstate Bancorp in 1981 (it is now part of Wells Fargo).

Weather Tower
The Walker Center is topped by a 64-foot weather tower, which gives a weather forecast based on the color of the lights. The weather tower was taken down in the 1980s due to a city ordinance but replaced in 2008. The meaning of the tower colors are:
 Blue: clear skies
 Flashing blue: cloudy skies
 Red: rain
 Flashing red: snow
A common mnemonic used by residents to remember the signals given by the tower is 
"Solid blue: skies are too,
flashing blue: clouds are due,
solid red: rain ahead,
flashing red: snow instead."
In December 2021, work began to upgrade the outdated neon glass tubes to GLLS LED Neon Flex. While the weather forecast will still be broadcast, the tower now will have "any color under the rainbow, as well as various animation effects” to engage with the community for various holidays and events.

See also

 National Register of Historic Places listings in Salt Lake City

References

External links

 Emporis.com
 http://wikimapia.org/1221287/Walker-Center
 https://www.youtube.com/watch?v=bIqtc5LtGJM

1912 establishments in Utah
Commercial buildings completed in 1912
Commercial buildings on the National Register of Historic Places in Utah
National Register of Historic Places in Salt Lake City
Skyscraper office buildings in Salt Lake City